Ardel Wray ( Mockbee; October 28, 1907 – October 14, 1983) was an American screenwriter and story editor, best known for her work on Val Lewton's classic horror films in the 1940s.  Her screenplay credits from that era include I Walked with a Zombie, The Leopard Man and Isle of the Dead.

In a late second career in television, she worked as a story editor and writer at Warner Bros. on 77 Sunset Strip, The Roaring 20s, and The Travels of Jaimie McPheeters.

Early life and career 
Born Ardel Mockbee on October 28, 1907, in Spokane, Washington, Ardel Wray was the only child of Virginia Brissac and Eugene Mockbee, both stage actors working in West Coast stock companies in the early 1900s. When her parents separated, she was brought to live with her maternal grandparents in San Francisco while her mother continued her career. She spent most of her childhood moving back and forth between her grandparents' home and a boarding school, and was raised primarily by her grandfather, B. F. Brisac, a prominent San Francisco businessman who was a surrogate father and mentor until his death in 1940.

Divorced from Mockbee, her mother married theatre director-manager John Griffith Wray in 1915 and moved with him to Los Angeles when he accepted a directing job at the Thomas Ince Studios. Ardel came to live with them in 1922, later taking her stepfather's last name. After graduating from high school, she worked as a model for Hollywood fashion designer Howard Greer, briefly attended the University of California at Los Angeles, and lived for a while at The Rehearsal Club in New York, where she considered and ultimately rejected the idea of becoming an actress.  She had two short-lived marriages in the decade following high school, both to California artists, Henry D. Maxwell (1928–1930) and Don Mansfield Caldwell (1933–1939).

Wray began her career working in studio story departments.  In 1933, after working as a staff writer developing properties for Carl Laemmle Jr.'s reopening of Universal Studios, she went to work in the Story Department at Warner Bros. where she met Dalton Trumbo, who was also working in the department at the time.  An early draft of Trumbo's novel Johnny Got His Gun with a handful of Wray's margin notes was found among her papers after she died, and anecdotes in Wray's family history suggest that she and Trumbo became "an item" for a while, but if there was a relationship beyond their shared interest in writing it did not last.  Wray moved to the story department at Fox Studios in 1936, then to RKO in 1938.  She and second husband Don Caldwell divorced in 1939.

Work at RKO and Paramount 
Sometime after starting work at RKO, Wray became involved in the Young Writers' Project, a program designed to identify and cultivate writing talent at the studio. A treatment found in her estate papers puts her in that program in 1941, but her screenwriting career really began in 1942 when she was given an opportunity to work with Val Lewton who was just beginning what would become a legendary short career as a producer of low-budget horror movies. Lewton had to recruit his production team from inside RKO, and he may have discovered Wray through her work in the Young Writers' program, but it is also possible that she was referred to him by Mark Robson who Lewton had recruited from the editing department, along with Robert Wise. (Robson had met Dalton Trumbo on the night shift at a bakery where they both worked in the early 1930s and met Wray when he joined Trumbo's circle of friends at Warner Bros.)

Wray's opportunity was, in effect, a writing audition under pressure: Lewton was behind on an ambitious schedule and Wray became the second writer to try to deliver a workable script from a short story about zombies that Lewton liked. The story had been written by an Ohio journalist named Inez Wallace who had borrowed heavily from Charlotte Brontë's Jane Eyre, and Lewton wanted to capitalize on Brontë's moody and foreboding atmosphere. Wray delivered the script for I Walked with a Zombie and went on to become a regular in the Lewton group.

Her next assignment for Lewton was to write the story and screenplay for The Leopard Man based on Black Alibi, a novel by Cornell Woolrich.  Later in 1943, she was loaned out to Maurice Geraghty's production group to write the story and screenplay for The Falcon and the Co-Eds, the seventh in his popular 'Falcon' detective series.  Back with the Lewton group in 1944, she developed Isle of the Dead (story and screenplay inspired by Boecklin's symbolist painting), Bedlam (historical research for a story inspired by A Rake's Progress, the paintings by William Hogarth), and wrote dialogue for Youth Runs Wild (Mark Robson's directorial debut).  In 1945, she wrote an original screenplay, Blackbeard The Pirate, for an A-movie property inspired by the life of the notorious English pirate Edward Teach and set to star Boris Karloff but never produced.

Remarried and living in Hollywood, Wray left RKO shortly before she gave birth to her daughter in May 1945. Her last produced screenplay for Lewton, Isle of the Dead, was released in September of that year and the Lewton group disbanded a few months later when Lewton left RKO.

In 1948, Wray was again approached by Lewton, then at Paramount Pictures, who was trying to rescue a project he was working on about the life of Lucrezia Borgia, with Paulette Goddard set to play the title role. Most of what is known about this project is found in chronicles of Lewton's career where, with minor variations, the authors suggest that the project initially belonged to some other producer, that Goddard or the studio didn't like Wray's script or the project was cancelled, and that Lewton tried to rework an "unused" script, but that somehow “the project slipped out of his hands.”

These accounts, however, do not align with Paramount records or with Wray's personal history.  Paramount Pictures production records show that Wray signed a contract in February 1948 to rewrite a script written by Michael Hogan titled A Mask for Lucrezia. By the time she completed that assignment a month later, Lewton had already been taken off the project and Wray had been optioned to continue working at Paramount on a new Alan Ladd project (Dead Letter, eventually released as Appointment with Danger), reporting to Sydney Boehm.

The McCarthy era 
Three months before Wray signed the contract at Paramount, industry producers had issued the Waldorf Statement and, by mid-1948, what came to be known as the witch-hunt of the McCarthy era was well under way in all studios.  In September 1948, shortly before Dead Letter and A Mask for Lucrezia were set to go into production, Wray was summoned to the business office at Paramount where, with little explanation, she was handed a list and asked to point to the names of people who were communist sympathizers; she declined. In addition to her former associates at RKO (including Trumbo, who had already been called before the HUAC), the list likely included the names of several people she was working with at Paramount, including Val Lewton (who along with Mark Robson had been under investigation by the FBI since 1945), Paulette Goddard (who had also appeared before the HUAC along with her husband Burgess Meredith), Josef Mischel (whose name was added to the Hollywood Blacklist in 1951), Robert L. Richards (whose name would appear on the Hollywood Blacklist after 1950, and Sydney Boehm (writing partner of 'Hollywood Ten' screenwriter Lester Cole who had been accused by the HUAC of putting subversive messages into scripts). Within a matter of days, the Ladd project was given to new writers, her credit for work on A Mask for Lucrezia (released as Bride of Vengeance) was removed, and she was released from her contract. Signaling the end of her career as a screenwriter, her agent severed their relationship and returned all her scripts and work papers to her via U.S. mail.

Wray's reasons for refusing to point to names on Paramount's list were not political. In recounting the experience to her daughter many years later, Wray described the person she met with as nervous and "obviously embarrassed" by what they were doing, at one point offering whispered advice that "they've already been named, dear - you won't be hurting anyone." Abstract philosophical ideas hotly debated over too many drinks at studio parties did not, to Wray's mind, constitute subversive activity; and to just wave her finger in the direction of a name she did not know—something her Paramount interrogator actually suggested—was unthinkable. Such personal knowledge as she had of Trumbo was over a decade old, and whatever was said about him or anyone else in The Hollywood Reporter was almost certainly based on gossip, if not entirely made up.

As it did for so many, Wray's decision had personal consequences as well as professional ones. Her mother (long divorced from John Wray and moving toward the end of a second career as a character actress in Hollywood) was frightened by the incident.  Concerned for her own career, she did not support her daughter's decision, and publicly questioned her loyalty. Wray's husband had just returned from serving in the Philippines in WWII and was unemployed; the situation put a strain on their marriage, which ended in divorce a few years later. Her circle of friends scattered.

Wray would not work as a screenwriter again for twelve years — a phenomenon that would come to be known as the "graylist." To support herself and her daughter, she worked as a reader in various studio story departments and took occasional side-jobs doing research and novelizing films for newspapers. She never remarried and, although she continued to look after her mother, their relationship never fully recovered from this period.

Career in television 
Wray had been working as a story analyst at Warner Bros. for two years when, in the summer of 1960, she was loaned out to Roy Huggins' production team to do some work on scripts for his television series Cheyenne and Maverick—a small writing contract which, although uncredited, marked the end of her tenure on the 'graylist'.  When Huggins left Warner Bros. at the end of that year, producer-director Boris Ingster hired her to be the story editor on his new series The Roaring 20s.

Wray would go on to write two (credited) episodes of The Roaring 20s, and she continued to work with Ingster for the next six years as a writer and story editor on  77 Sunset Strip, The Travels of Jaimie McPheeters, and as assistant to the producer on the movie Guns of Diablo at MGM.

Retirement and death 

While working at MGM, Wray was diagnosed with cataracts. When her contract on Guns of Diablo ended, she returned to Warner Bros., which was closer to home and did not require driving at night, and she continued working as a story analyst there, and at The Walt Disney Studios until her failing vision forced her to stop. To go through the then long and complicated cataract surgery and recovery process, she retired in 1972 and lived in Santa Fe, New Mexico for the next several years – an area she remembered fondly from her trip there in 1943 to find and photograph the places that would become the sets and backdrops in The Leopard Man.

Wray returned to Los Angeles in 1980, was diagnosed with breast cancer in 1983 and died on October 14, 1983, aged 75. Her mother had died only four years earlier at age 96. As she directed, her ashes were scattered at sea.

Contribution to the Lewton legacy 
Wray wrote three of the collection films celebrated in Martin Scorsese’s 2007 documentary film Val Lewton: The Man in the Shadows, two of them groundbreaking screenplays that helped define the genre of the psychological thriller and establish Lewton's reputation as the master of horror.  In Wray, Lewton found a writer with a gift for character development who was also willing to take on challenging or controversial subject matter: the supernatural, a serial killer, the plagues of war and superstition, and the relationships in the notorious Borgia family—all were out of the mainstream when Wray sat down to write about them.  Her ability to seduce 1940s audiences into following Lewton down a path to some of the darker corners of human experience was evident in the unexpected critical and box office success of those films.

Wray was also a member of one of the most famous B-movie units at work during what is now viewed as the 'Golden Age' of Hollywood—a group whose creative energy and inventiveness made Lewton's success possible. She spoke about working with the group in a conversation with her daughter many years later, a recollection that shines a clear light on the group's chemistry and skill, and the special place it held in Wray's heart:She rarely spoke about her early career or the McCarthy era.  But when I asked once what it was like working with Lewton, she smiled -- thought about it for a long moment -- and then told me about the night the group spent figuring out how to build to the first murder in The Leopard Man.  The scene she had written was pure psychological terror, trading on very basic fears -- of the dark, of being punished unjustly, locked out of your own home, abandoned by people you trust -- and at the same time it sets up the mystery that is the premise of the entire film.  They were under pressure to get this sequence right, and almost everyone was there that night. The session went well into the small hours of the morning, was filled with laughter, and included a hilarious riff as one of them experimented with a set of castanets, which turned out to be the key to building the tension and suspense. They worked their way through a dozen different shot sequences before they were satisfied and, listening to her, I had the very strong impression that they would have come up with that same elegant, powerful scene even if they had been working with an A-movie budget and had more time.  As Agee so famously observed about Lewton, these were people who understood film and cared about human beings.  I can still see the smile on her face as she recalled that night.  -- Stefani Warren, September 2016

Filmography 
With one exception, the credits listed are per Wray's Internet Movie Database Filmography; where there is a discrepancy with other sources, clarifications can be found in individual footnotes.

Writer

 I Walked with a Zombie, 1943 (screenplay)  
 The Leopard Man, 1943   (screenplay) 
 The Falcon and the Co-Eds, 1943   (story and screenplay)
  Youth Runs Wild, 1944   (additional dialogue)
 Isle of the Dead, 1945   (written by)  
 Bride of Vengeance, 1949 (contributing writer) (uncredited) 
 Blackbeard the Pirate... original screenplay, RKO circa 1945, unproduced
 The Roaring 20s TV Series, 1961   (writer, 2 episodes)
 77 Sunset Strip TV Series, 1963-64   (teleplay, 3 episodes)    
 The Travels of Jaimie McPheeters TV series, 1964   (writer, 1 episode)
 Ritual, 2002  (1943 screenplay of I Walked with a Zombie remake)

Story Editor
 77 Sunset Strip, 1962-1964 (TV Series)
 The Roaring 20s, 1961-1962 (TV Series)
 The Travels of Jaimie McPheeters, 1964 (TV Series)
 Guns of Diablo (1965)

Notes and related history

References 

1907 births
1983 deaths
American women screenwriters
20th-century American women writers
20th-century American screenwriters
Hollywood blacklist